Bolton-on-Swale is a village and civil parish in the Richmondshire district of North Yorkshire, England.  In 2015, North Yorkshire County Council estimated the population of the civil parish to be 70.

History

The village is mentioned in the Domesday Book as Boletone and belonged to Count Alan of Brittany as Tenant-in-Chief. The manor had been granted by Count Alan to Thor at the time of the Norman invasion, but afterwards it was granted to Enisant Musard.
The manor was passed to Roald the Constable thereafter until it came into the possession of the Scrope family in Masham. They held the titles until around 1630. The descent is somewhat confused after this, but the title was seen to be in use in the 18th century by the Burton and Garthwaite families. In 1820 the title was in use by the Earl of Tyrconnell. The etymology of the name derives from the Old English bōðl-tūn, meaning an enclosure with buildings.

Governance

The village lies within the Richmond UK Parliament constituency. It also lies within the Catterick Bridge electoral division of North Yorkshire County Council and the Brompton-on-Swale and Scorton ward of Richmondshire District Council.

Community and culture

Bolton-on-Swale St Mary's C of E (VA) Primary School, located in the village, serves Bolton-on-Swale and Scorton. There are under 100 pupils, split into 4 classes.

Geography

As the name suggests it is close to the River Swale. Bolton Beck is a tributary of the Swale which passes underneath a small bridge at the north of the village. The village is situated on the B6271 road between Scorton and Northallerton. The Coast to Coast Walk passes through the village.

Climate

Religion

The village church is dedicated to St Mary; it serves the village and a number of other small villages, hamlets and farmsteads in the surrounding countryside. The church is a Grade II* Listed Building built on the site of previous Norman and Saxon structures. The present building was erected during the early 14th century and was enlarged and restored by George Fowler Jones in 1859.  Some sarcophagi were found during the restoration and may now be found on the interior wall by the door. In the vestry an unusual stone roof exists which seems to be a portion of the original Saxon structure. In the graveyard is the tomb of Henry Jenkins who, it is claimed, lived to be 169 years old. The dates on the tomb are 1500–1670.

Notable buildings

Nearby is Bolton Old Hall, a 15th-century peel tower, altered and extended in the 16th and 17th centuries. The building is Grade II listed by English Heritage.

See also
Forest, North Yorkshire

References

External links

Villages in North Yorkshire
Civil parishes in North Yorkshire